"If I Could Fly" is a song and single made by German power metal band Helloween, from their album The Dark Ride. The song begins with a grand piano that combines itself with distorted guitars and pounding drums. The lyrics depict a man in a journey of self-discovery. The song was written by Helloween frontman Andi Deris. The song has become one of Helloween's most popular, joining Future World, I Want Out and "Eagle Fly Free" on their live setlists. It was released in some countries as If I Could Fly. In Japan, it was released as Mr. Torture.

Track listing

Japanese Version

Personnel
 Andi Deris - vocals 
 Michael Weikath - guitars
 Roland Grapow - guitars
 Markus Grosskopf - bass guitar 
 Uli Kusch - drums
 John Ellenbrock - acoustic grand piano

References

2000 singles
Helloween songs
Songs written by Andi Deris
Nuclear Blast Records singles
2000 songs
German hard rock songs